The 1993–94 Calgary Flames season was the 14th National Hockey League season in Calgary.  It was a season of change across the NHL, as the league reorganized its divisions and playoff format.  The Smythe Division was retired and the Flames joined the new Pacific Division of the Western Conference, as the NHL aligned itself with the other major sports leagues in naming divisions by geographical boundaries.  The change angered fans, who preferred the traditional convention, which honoured the game's past builders.

Realignment also led to significant changes in the playoff format, as the top eight teams in each conference now qualified for the post-season, rather than the top four in each division.  Under the new format, the top team in each division was guaranteed one of the top two seeds, and declared the divisional champion, as opposed to having to win two playoff rounds to capture the division title.  Thus, the Flames became the first Pacific Division champions, and the second seed in the playoffs.  They faced the second place Vancouver Canucks in the playoffs rather than the fourth place Mighty Ducks of Anaheim who failed to qualify under the new system.

The playoffs ended in another bitter disappointment, as the Flames blew a 3–1 series lead, losing the last three games in overtime to the Canucks, who would eventually go onto the Stanley Cup finals before bowing out to the New York Rangers.

Two Flames represented the Western Conference at the 1994 All-Star Game: Forward Joe Nieuwendyk and defenceman Al MacInnis.

For the second consecutive season, four Flames reached the 30-goal plateau. Three of them (Theoren Fleury, Robert Reichel and Gary Roberts) were also 40-goal scorers.

Prior to the season, Calgary lost two players in the 1993 NHL Expansion Draft, as the Florida Panthers selected defenceman Alexander Godynyuk 13th overall, and centre Brian Skrudland 32nd overall.  The Mighty Ducks of Anaheim did not select any Flames players.

Regular season

The Flames were shorthanded a total of 465 times during the regular season, the most among all 26 teams.

Season standings

Schedule and results

Playoffs
The Flames entered the 1994 Stanley Cup playoffs as the second seed under the new alignment, facing the seventh seeded Vancouver Canucks.  After getting blown out at home in game one, the Flames responded by winning the next three games to take a 3–1 series lead.  The Flames, however, lost the last three games in overtime, as they proved unable to overcome a series of injuries to key players, and the tenacious play of the Canucks.  Pavel Bure scored the series winner on a breakaway in double overtime for the Canucks, who reached the Stanley Cup finals before falling to the New York Rangers in seven games.

For the Flames, it was another year of playoff frustration, as for the fifth consecutive year, Calgary failed to reach the second round of the post-season.

Player statistics

Skaters
Note: GP = Games played; G = Goals; A = Assists; Pts = Points; PIM = Penalty minutes

†Denotes player spent time with another team before joining Calgary.  Stats reflect time with the Flames only.

Goaltenders
Note: GP = Games played; TOI = Time on ice (minutes); W = Wins; L = Losses; OT = Overtime/shootout losses; GA = Goals against; SO = Shutouts; GAA = Goals against average

†Denotes player spent time with another team before joining Calgary.  Stats reflect time with the Flames only.

Transactions
The Flames were involved in the following transactions during the 1993–94 season.

Trades

Free agents

Signings

Waivers

Draft picks

Calgary's picks at the 1993 NHL Entry Draft, held in Quebec City, Quebec.

Farm teams

Saint John Flames
The 1993–94 American Hockey League season was the first for the Flames top minor league affiliate as the new expansion team was created in Saint John, New Brunswick.  The Flames posted a respectable 37–33–10 record in their first season, good enough for second in the Atlantic division. They fell to the Moncton Hawks in seven games in the first round of the playoffs, however.  Cory Stillman led the Flames with 35 goals, while Mark Freer lead with 86 points. Jason Muzzatti was the starting goaltender, posting a 26–23–3 record with a 3.74 GAA in 51 games.

See also
1993–94 NHL season

References

Player stats: 2006–07 Calgary Flames Media Guide, pg 118
Game log: 2006–07 Calgary Flames Media Guide, pg 137
Team standings:  1993–94 NHL standings @hockeydb.com
Trades: hockeydb.com player pages

Calgary Flames seasons
C
C